Jorge Zerbino (born 27 December 1991) is a Uruguayan rugby union player. He was named in Uruguay's squad for the 2015 Rugby World Cup. He plays as a second-row.

References

1991 births
Living people
Uruguayan rugby union players
Uruguay international rugby union players
Rugby union locks